Vijay Patkar (born 29 May 1961) is an Indian theatre, television, Marathi film and Bollywood actor. He is best known for his comic roles in films like Tezaab, Apna Sapna Money Money, Golmaal 3, Tees Maar Khan, Daddy Cool, AafBa Kk  All the Best: Fun Begins and Singham. He is the president of Akhil Bharatiya Marathi Chitrapat Mahamandal (ABMCM).

Personal life
Patkar was brought up in Girgaon, Mumbai. He completed his education in Union High School and Siddharth college. Later he had a job in Bank of India through Artiste's quota. 

He has one brother, Dayal Patkar.

Career
Patkar started acting in college with the one act play Majhi Pehli Chori (My First Theft). In 1988, director N. Chandra gave him his first film role, as Anil Kapoor's friend, in Tezaab. Patkar continued to work in theatre, Marathi movies and television advertisements. He has been greatly influenced by Charlie Chaplin. It reflects in his television commercials. He won an IIFA award for best model for his Cello Tape TV commercial. He also won the award of Marathi Natya Parishad for his play Halka Fulka Natak. 

In 2006, he directed and produced the Marathi movie Ek Unad Diwas. In 2012, he directed the movie Riwayat, on female foeticide in India. In 2012, Patkar directed and produced the Marathi language movie Laavu Ka Laath. As of April 2013, Patkar had directed seven films and produced three.

Filmography

Actor

Director
As a director of Marathi films-

Television

References

External links
 

Living people
Male actors in Marathi cinema
Male actors in Hindi cinema
Indian male television actors
Indian male comedians
1963 births
Male actors in Marathi theatre
Marathi actors